On the Spot is a 1940 American comedy film directed by Howard Bretherton and written by George Waggner and Dorothy Davenport. The film stars Frankie Darro, Mary Kornman, Mantan Moreland, John St. Polis, Robert Warwick and Maxine Leslie. The film was released on June 11, 1940, by Monogram Pictures.

Plot

Cast           
Frankie Darro as Frankie 'Doc' Kelly
Mary Kornman as Ruth Hunter
Mantan Moreland as Jefferson White
John St. Polis as Doc Hunter
Robert Warwick as Cyrus Haddon
Maxine Leslie as Gerry Dailey
Lillian Elliott as Mrs. Kelly
LeRoy Mason as Smilin' Bill
Gene O'Donnell as Slats Eckert
Russell Hopton as Dave Nolan
Jeffrey Sayre as Hype Innes

References

External links
 

1940 films
American comedy films
1940 comedy films
Monogram Pictures films
Films directed by Howard Bretherton
American black-and-white films
1940s English-language films
1940s American films